Gigglebiz is a British children's comedy television programme (described as a 'live-action comedy sketch show' by the BBC) consisting of five series that have been broadcast on CBeebies, the BBC's younger children's channel, starting in 2009 (excluding the pilots). Gigglebiz is also available on BBC iPlayer for over a year.

The TV series was starred and created by Justin Fletcher, who plays the characters in all of the comedy sketches and also wrote a few sketches in its first series. Some of the sketches are filmed in the studio, while other sketches are filmed outside; for example, one is filmed at Portmeirion, used for the fictional town of Wiggyville where Captain Adorable's sketches are set from Series 1 to 2. The show is interspersed with a selection of children called the Gigglekids, who tell jokes to Justin himself, in their own section called 'Giggle Box'.

History 
Gigglebiz's production began in the mid-1990s, when Justin Fletcher produced a showreel named Justin Time, to showcase his acting abilities to television companies. In November 2008, CBeebies aired three TV pilots featuring Fletcher, called Humphrey the Painter, Gigglebox, and Captain Adorable: The Locked Door Adventure, with the objective being that one of them would become a full series. Following the broadcast of the pilots, CBeebies announced on November 25 that Gigglebox would become the full series, and would air within the channel's 2009 schedule. On May 5, 2009, the show's final title was announced as Gigglebiz, and that it would begin airing within the summer of that year.

The first series was broadcast in September 2009, comprising 25 13-minute episodes and 20 characters each. The first episode premiered on 7 September 2009. A Christmas special was broadcast on 15 December 2010. The second series comprised 15 episodes being broadcast in January 2011 and saw several characters disappear to make way for five new ones, replacing them. The spinoff quiz show GiggleQuiz came after Gigglebiz, premiering on 28 October 2019 and later in December 2020.

Characters

Current characters 
 Arthur Sleep (Series 1-present, GiggleQuiz), a newsreader of a Northern origin who is a bad joke-teller, is always falling asleep, and is also the host of GiggleQuiz. Additionally, he appeared in the "Justin Time" showreel.
 Rapids Johnson (Gigglebox Pilot, Series 1-present, GiggleQuiz), a wildlife explorer who's always on the hunt for elusive wildlife (usually bears) but never actually gets to spot them. In the Gigglebox pilot, Rapids was called Jungle Jimbo and was Australian, parodying Steve Irwin.
 Gail Force (Gigglebox Pilot, Series 1-present, GiggleQuiz), a weather presenter who has a knack of predicting weather that happens only to her. She additionally works as a reporter and often distracts and ruins people or items she is reporting on. In Series 5 Gail has her own chat show called "Gail". Gail is one of the team captains in GiggleQuiz. She also appeared in the original "Gigglebox" pilot.  
 DIY Dan (Gigglebox Pilot, Series 1, 3-present), a clumsy DIY enthusiast. He is described as television's worst DIY expert and his stuff is grist to his DIY mill. He doesn't speak and his segments instead feature a narrator, however in the Gigglebox pilot, he did speak and was named Andy Guy.
 Humphrey (Humphrey the Painter Pilot, Series 1, 3-present), a silent man who is irrepressible and inquisitive. His trusty dog companion and best friend is Woody the dog. Like with Captain Adorable, Humphrey originally appeared in his own standalone pilot (where he was a painter) before being added to Gigglebiz.
 Ann Teak (Series 1–4, GiggleQuiz), an elderly bossy antiques expert who thinks that she knows everything about antiques.
 The Lost Pirate (Series 1–2, 4-present, GiggleQuiz), a pirate who is always on the lookout for his lost treasure but has a habit of taking mundane situations too seriously. In Series 1 and 2 the Lost Pirate has a parrot called Captain Squawk and in Series 4 and 5 he has one called Captain Crackers.
 Captain Adorable (Captain Adorable: The Locked Door Adventure Pilot, Series 1-present, GiggleQuiz), an egotistical superhero who is depicted as less-than-super. He originally appeared in his own standalone pilot before being added to Gigglebiz.
 Nana Knickerbocker (Series 1, 3-present, GiggleQuiz), a pantomime dame who is described as everyone's favourite, lives her life as if she were on stage, and lacks common sense in the actual world due to this. In Series 4 and 5 Nana has her own panto shop. In GiggleQuiz Nana hosts her own round called "Nana's Panto Showdown".
 Professor Muddles (Series 1-present, GiggleQuiz), an eccentric scientist who often gets words mixed up and whose experiments never go to plan.
 Dina Lady (Series 1–2, 4-present, GiggleQuiz), a homely cook who takes the names of dishes to their very literal meanings and whose assistant is Tommy Tummy. In Series 4 Dina became the host of a Great British Bake-off-esque show, with Tommy as her co-host. In Series 5 Dina became the delivery driver for a catering company.
 Keith Fitt (Series 2-present, GiggleQuiz), a Geordie sports instructor whose "20–year" experience hasn't gained him any skills. Keith is one of the team captains in GiggleQuiz. 
 Will Singalot (Series 3-present), a minstrel and one of Robin Hood's Merry Men who infuriates Robin Hood with his nonstop singing and always spoils Robin's efforts to impress Maid Marian.
 Dan Step (Series 3-present), a tap dancer who often gets confused. He doesn't speak.
 Enrico Paso Doble (Series 3-present), a dancer who isn't very good at dancing and gets distracted during his routines. He is played by Justin he doesn’t speak. 
 Wizard Tripwick (Series 5-present, GiggleQuiz), a wizard who isn't very good at magic.
 Wild Wez (Series 5-present), a cowboy who always focuses on how to clean up his barn, but his barnyard animals always mess it up again. He doesn't speak.

Former characters 
 The Burrito Brothers (Gigglebox Pilot, Series 1–4), a trio of strongmen who haven't seen good days. The older two are played by Karl Magee and Gary Cross. The youngest brother, played by Justin, always unintentionally ruins their acts in some way. They don't speak, although they do make vocal sounds. They also appeared in the original "Gigglebox" pilot. 
 Packed Lunch Pete (Series 1), a wandering man who always tries to eat his packed lunch in the wrong locations but fails. He doesn't speak. 
 Anna Conda (Showreel, Series 1), a reptile expert who makes deliberately cheesy jokes based on reptiles.
 Chip Monk (Gigglebox Pilot, Series 1), an eccentric pet shop worker who tries his best not to have to sell the animals in his shop to his customers. He also appeared in the original "Gigglebox" pilot.
 Major Boogie (Series 1–2), a tired, old tin soldier who likes to dance when no one is around, along with the fellow toys on his shelf.
 Milkshake Jake (Series 1), a sundae bar worker who has a messy line in milkshakes and always gets distracted by the professions of his customers.
 King Flannel (Gigglebox Pilot, Series 1–3), a naughty, childish, old monarch who needs to be kept in line by his beady-eyed and long-suffering butler for several reasons. Between series 1 and 2 He only spoke in gibberish sounds, but by series 3, his dialogue became a lot more understandable, he also appeared in the original "Gigglebox" pilot.
 Postie (Series 1), a postman who always tries (but fails) to deliver the post on time. At just 3 sketches, Postie is the least frequent character in the entire series. He doesn't speak.
 Farmer Dung (Series 1–3), a jolly and at times, incomprehensible farmer who uses wordplay and who has an assistant called Reggie.
 Simon Pieman (Christmas special, Series 2), a pie deliveryman whose deliveries are done on wheels and whose pies always end up in his face. 
 Doctor Doctor (Series 2), a doctor who likes telling "doctor doctor" jokes to his patients. 
 Opera Oliver (Series 2), an opera-singing waiter who likes to sing about food so much that he tends to forget the condition of his hungry customers, who usually end up leaving. 
 Rod and Annette (Series 2), a fisher couple. Rod (Justin) loves to catch fish but loses the catch and his wife, Annette (Anita Dobson), loves to chat, never noticing his catch. Rod doesn't speak.
 Sue Keeper (Series 3), a zookeeper who always gets her animal facts mixed up. 
 Storybook Stan (Series 3–4), a storyteller whose attempts to tell a story always end in disaster. 
 Will Barrow (Series 3–4), a gardener whose gardening experience is always ruined by the animals residing in his garden. He doesn't speak.
 Ug, and Ig (Series 3), a cave duo. Ug (Justin) always tries to invent something and often fumbles with it due to his strength, Ig (Freddie Butterfield) has to always end up helping him. Their inventions, in doing so, are never used as how they were originally intended to be. Ug only speaks in gibberish sounds while Ig doesn't speak.

Creators 
Gigglebiz was created by Justin Fletcher, who was best-known for Mr. Tumble.

The other creators are:

 Director: Geoff Coward
 Editors: Richard Shadbolt, Eben Clancy, Paul Shields
 Script editor: Nathan Cockerill
 Executive producers: Vanessa Amberleigh, Tony Reed
 Designers: Nick Bruin, Dan Mort, Adele Murphy, Harriet Ridley, Kim Thackeray
 Cameras: George Glowdansky, Jake Pennington, Daniel Brown
 Production manager: Justine Hatcher
 Costume designers: Robert Skidmore
 Makeup designer: Katie Meakin
 Location director: Sarah Wilson
 Vision mixers: Jenny Bozson, Linda Kelly
 Sound: Dave Chapman 
 Lighting director: Lee Allen, Jim Ewart, Nathaniell Killer, Oliver Welsh
 Composer: Barrie Bignold
 Graphics: Character Shop, Made In Colour
 Visual Effects: Tidsey Graphics

Spinoff 
On 3 July 2018, a spinoff quiz show, entitled GiggleQuiz, was announced, being made with Justin Fletcher reprising his main character role. It first aired on 28 October 2019. Unlike Gigglebiz, it is, as said, a quiz show. The aim of the game was to answer questions about clips, shown from the previous series (Series 3–5). It is hosted by Arthur Sleep, and the team captains are Gail Force and Keith Fitt. Nana Knickerbocker hosts her own round named "Nana's Panto Showdown". Wizard Tripwick, Dina Lady, Captain Adorable, Rapids Johnson, Ann Teak, The Lost Pirate, and Professor Muddles appear as the contestants. The other characters make cameos. GiggleQuiz began its second season on 16 December 2020, starting with the episode "A Giggle Quizmas". It later re-aired in March 2021 to air the episode "Wizard Tripwick's Crystal Ball".  
GiggleQuiz is also available on BBC iPlayer for over a year.

GiggleQuiz Episodes

Series 1 
 Dina Lady's Brussels Sprout Cake
 Captain Adorable's Sidekick. 
 The Lost Pirate's Treasure 
 Keith Fitt's Quiz Fit. 
 Super Banana Gail 
 Keith Fitt's Juggling
 Rapids Johnson's Quizzly Bear 
 Ann Teak's Painting 
 Arthur's Tie Break
 Professor Muddles' Brain Buster. 
 Gail Force's Thinking Cap
 Ann Teak's Antique Wand 
 Rapids Johnson's Helping Bear 
 Professor Muddles' Handy Invention
 Gail Wants to Sing

Series 2 
A Giggle Quizmas. 
Wizard Tripwick's Crystal Ball 
Dina Lady's Ice Cream Machine. 
Professor Muddles' Mystery Machine. 
Keith Fitt's Broken Buzzer
Arthur Sleep's Leaky Pipes 
Dina Lady's Cakey Mix Up.  
Keith Fitt's Pesky Fly. 
The Lost Pirate's Empty Chest. 
The Muddles-Keith Muddle Up. 
Keith Fitt's Rumbly Tummy
Wizard Tripwick's New Wand.

References

External links 
 

British children's comedy television series
2009 British television series debuts
2000s British children's television series
2010s British children's television series
CBeebies
Television series by BBC Studios